The Youngblood Brass Band is an American brass band from Madison, Wisconsin that was established in 1998. The band has released six albums and has toured throughout the United States and Europe.

History
The band came together in 1995 as the One Lard Biskit Brass Band, subsequently releasing the album Better Recognize locally. The Youngblood name dates from 1998, the year the group put out their first album, Word On The Street. In 2000 Youngblood released Unlearn, which featured appearances by Talib Kweli, Mike Ladd, DJ Skooly and Ike Willis. Unlearn, which like Word On The Street was released independently, garnered the band significant attention and led to them being signed to Ozone Music NYC. The band's first album for Ozone, called center:level:roar, came out in 2003.

In 2004, sousaphonist and primary arranger Nat McIntosh left the group. As McIntosh’s music was a "main component of the band's sound since inception", his departure marked a change in sound for Youngblood Brass Band, as chronicled by the release of Live. Places and Is That a Riot?. The band's work during this time features a harder hip-hop edge with stronger punk influences compared to their other work.

In 2005 they released a live album entitled live. places. on their Layered Music record label. Is That a Riot? (2006) was supported by multiple international tours and festival appearances. 

McIntosh rejoined the band in 2013, and his playing and songwriting both appear on Pax Volumi, which was released on September 9, 2013 by Tru Thoughts. They released '[20 Years Young, a compilation spanning the band's two-decade existence, in 2017, and followed it in 2018 with the most recent Covers 1 EP, both released independently.

Educational work
Band members credit "really good public school system arts-education programs" for inspiring their love of music, and they make an effort to play for schools as well as at clubs and larger venues. Under the aegis of the Layered Arts Collective, which band members co-founded, they also presented musical lectures where in addition to performing, they discussed the history of brass bands and hip-hop. Layered Arts Collective also functioned as a record label/publishing house for their family of artists (including Cougar, a group of experimental rockers that also counted David Henzie-Skogen as a member). Youngblood has also released sheet music transcriptions of all songs included on their albums, since many university and high school music ensembles have begun including YBB in their repertoire.

Members
Current
 Zach Lucas – alto and tenor saxophones 
 Tony Barba – tenor saxophone and bass clarinet 
 Adam Meckler – trumpet 
 Charley Wagner – trumpet 
 Joe Goltz – trombone 
 Matt Hanzelka – trombone 
 Nat McIntosh – trombone/euphonium
 Miles Lyons – sousaphone 
 Conor Elmes – percussion 
 Tom Reschke – percussion 
 Natalie Baker – live audio engineer

Former
 Dave Skogen – percussion
Arian Macklin
Carl Bartsch – Tenor Saxophone
Moses Patrou – Percussion
Jonah Gaster
Josh Smith – Trumpet
Mike Boman – Trumpet
Ben McIntosh – trombone 

Discography

Albums
 Better Recognize* (1997)
 Word on the Street (1998)
 Unlearn (2000)
 Center:Level:Roar (2003)
 Live. Places. (2005)
 Is That a Riot? (2006)
 Riot Instrumentals EP (2007)
 Pax Volumi (2013)
 20 Years Young (2017)
 Covers 1 EP (2018)*'' recorded by One Lard Biskit Brass Band

References

External links

Youngblood Brass Band
Musical groups from Wisconsin
American jazz ensembles